Nikola "Nick" Radosavljevic (born September 2, 1993) is an English-American soccer player.

Career

College and Amateur
Radosavljevic initially began playing college soccer at Catawba College in 2012. He transferred to Pacific Lutheran University in the same year, but didn't play with their soccer team. He again moved in 2013 to play at American River College, before being scouted and moving again to play his junior season at California State University, Chico.

Professional
Radosavljevic signed with United Soccer League side Saint Louis FC at the beginning of their 2017 season.

Personal
Nick is the son of former professional soccer player and coach Preki, who played for clubs such Everton, Portsmouth, Kansas City Wizards and the United States national team.

References

External links

1993 births
Living people
American soccer players
Catawba Indians men's soccer players
American River Beavers men's soccer players
Chico State Wildcats men's soccer players
Saint Louis FC players
Association football midfielders
Soccer players from Illinois
USL Championship players
Sportspeople from Oak Park, Illinois